Somerset Amphitheater is the largest outdoor amphitheater and camping venue in the Twin Cities (Minnesota) and Western Wisconsin area. Located across the St. Croix River, the venue consists of 200 acres of land.

Located in Somerset, Wisconsin and next to the Apple River, it has been a Midwest destination for many decades for music fans, along with tubing and camping enthusiasts alike. A typical season runs from May through October with music performances and other events. The layout is flexible, but typically there is seating on the floor and general admission (lawn) that surrounds the stage in a bowl-like fashion. The total capacity ranges from 20,000 to 40,000, depending on the layout.

About the venue

A concert site since 1981, the venue changed its name to Somerset Amphitheater in 2011 when new owner Matt Mithun (of the Mithun family) took over. Since then many upgrades and improvements have been made to the amphitheater and onsite campgrounds. The amphitheater expanded the removable reserved seating area and built an enclosed Saloon with a bar for a more intimate setting with an approximate capacity of 1,000. In 2013 the Grove stage was added in the valley between the main amphitheater and the North Campground. The Grove has a capacity of approximately 10,000. There are three campgrounds onsite; the North and South Campgrounds, which are both general camping, and the VIP Campground which has electric and water hookups for RVs and permanent bathrooms and showers.

In 2011 the first Somerset Amphitheater concert under new ownership opened with a weekend full of music at the Soundtown Music and Camping Festival. Over thirty bands performed on the three stages, and featured the nationally known artist group The Flaming Lips as a headliner. This was a small yet promising preview of what the amphitheater would bring concert goers for years to come.

Since its reopening, the amphitheater has hosted many concerts and events, including the touring acts of My Morning Jacket, the first annual Knotfest featuring Slipknot, Summer Set Music and Camping Festival, Northern Invasion, Trampled by Turtles and The Avett Brothers. Besides musical performances, the venue hosted Tough Mudder, a British military style obstacle course and the Border Battle Beer Festival, a friendly rivalry of Minnesota and Wisconsin breweries battling each other for the most favored among taste testers.

History
Before 2011, the venue had music acts varying from the Blues, Country, Bluegrass/Folk, Indie, Classic Rock, Hard Rock, Heavy Metal and Alternative genres perform on the stages. Annual concert festivals included Apple River Country Splash, Ozzfest, and 93X Fest (previously Edgefest). Other music tours featured acts of the Family Values Tour 2007, Projekt Revolution the Vans Warped Tour, Bob Dylan in '03, Soul Asylum in '93, Violent Femmes (from Milwaukee) in '94 and Garbage (from Madison) in '96 (at 93X EdgeFest). It hosted Illinois' REO Speedwagon in '93, and Disturbed and Chevelle in 2016 (at the Northern Invasion festival). The first concert held at the amphitheater was in 1981 with Charlie Daniels.

Events

See also
List of contemporary amphitheatres

References

External links
Somerset Amphitheater Official Website

Buildings and structures in St. Croix County, Wisconsin
Music venues in Wisconsin
Tourist attractions in St. Croix County, Wisconsin
Event venues established in 1981
1981 establishments in Wisconsin